In memory addressing for Intel x86 computer architectures, segment descriptors are a part of the segmentation unit, used for translating a logical address to a linear address. Segment descriptors describe the memory segment referred to in the logical address.
The segment descriptor (8 bytes long in 80286 and later) contains the following fields:

 A segment base address
 The segment limit which specifies the segment size
 Access rights byte containing the protection mechanism information
 Control bits

Structure 
The x86 and x86-64 segment descriptor has the following form:

 

Where the fields stand for:

 Base Address  Starting memory address of the segment. Its length is 32 Bit and it is created of the lower Part Bit 16 to 31, and the upper Part Bit 0 to 7, followed by Bit 24 to 31. 
 Segment Limit  Its length is 20 bit and is created of the lower Part Bit 0 to 15 and the upper Part Bit 16 to 19. It defines the address of the last accessible data. The length is one more than the value stored here.  How exactly this should be interpreted depends on the Granularity bit of the segment descriptor. 
 G=Granularity  If clear, the limit is in units of bytes, with a maximum of 220 bytes.  If set, the limit is in units of 4096-byte pages, for a maximum of 232 bytes.
 D/B 
 D = Default operand size : If clear, this is a 16-bit code segment; if set, this is a 32-bit segment.
 B = Big: If set, the maximum offset size for a data segment is increased to 32-bit 0xffffffff. Otherwise it's the 16-bit max 0x0000ffff. Essentially the same meaning as "D".
 L=Long  If set, this is a 64-bit segment (and D must be zero), and code in this segment uses the 64-bit instruction encoding. "L" cannot be set at the same time as "D" aka "B". (Bit 21 in the image)
 AVL=Available  For software use, not used by hardware  (Bit 20 in the image with the label A)
 P=Present  If clear, a "segment not present" exception is generated on any reference to this segment
 DPL=Descriptor privilege level  Privilege level (ring) required to access this descriptor
 Type If set, this is a code segment descriptor. If clear, this is a data/stack segment descriptor, which has "D" replaced by "B", "C" replaced by "E"and "R" replaced by "W". This is in fact a special case of the 2-bit type field, where the preceding bit 12 cleared as "0" refers to more internal system descriptors, for LDT, LSS, and gates.
 C=Conforming  Code in this segment may be called from less-privileged levels.
 E=Expand-Down If clear, the segment expands from base address up to base+limit. If set, it expands from maximum offset down to limit, a behavior usually used for stacks.
 R=Readable  If clear, the segment may be executed but not read from.
 W=Writable  If clear, the data segment may be read but not written to.
 A=Accessed  This bit is set to 1 by hardware when the segment is accessed, and cleared by software.

See also
 Burroughs large systems descriptors
 Memory segment
 Memory address

References

Further reading

External links
 Intel 80386 Reference Programmer's Manual - Segment Translation

X86 architecture
Operating system kernels
Memory management